Shireen Benjamin (born 8 September 1988 in London, England) was crowned Miss West Africa 2009/10, representing Sierra Leone, at the pageant in London where she became the second holder of the title.

References

External links 
 Miss West Africa

1988 births
Living people
English people of Sierra Leonean descent
Sierra Leonean beauty pageant winners
Models from London